Giovanni Andrés Hernández Soto (born 17 June 1976), is a Colombian football manager and former player. He is the current manager of Atlético F.C. in the Colombian Categoría Primera B, and formerly managed Uniautónoma, Real Cartagena and Junior.

Before his career as a coach, he was famous for his technical ability to create plays, and ability to create goals out of free kicks.

History

Early career
Giovanni Hernández made his professional debut at the age of 17 with Once Caldas in 1993. In 1995, he played for América de Cali and he scored 5 goals during this season. He continued playing for the club during the 1996 Copa Libertadores where he scored 2 goals. He played for Independiente Medellín during 1998. At the end of that year, he was signed by Deportivo Cali.

Deportivo Cali 
He played for Deportivo Cali in the 1999 Copa Libertadores as a substitute, but after a few goals he became a starter for the 2001 season, where he scored 13 goals.

Colón
In the second half of 2003, Hernández was sold to Argentine club Colón de Santa Fe. In his debut match on 12 August, he scored a free kick goal and made an assist, in a 3-1 victory against Velez Sarsfield as part of the first stage of the 2003 Copa Sudamericana. He quickly became one of the favorites in the Argentine league reaching a total of 12 goals that season.

Colo-Colo
On 15 January 2007, Hernandez joined Chilean club Colo-Colo on a one-year contract with a transfer fee of $800,000. He was brought in to replace the 2006 South American Player of the Year, Matías Fernández, and was handed the prestigious #10 jersey. He was a vital part of the team that would eventually win the 2007 Apertura championship, being the second top scoring of the team with 7 goals. Colo-Colo also won the 2007 Clausura, with Hernandez being part of the squad, and scoring 6 goals. 

At the end of the year, Colo-Colo's president wanted him to stay at the club, but Hernandez told the press, "I asked for a Coca-Cola, but I got water with gas" meaning that he had certain terms that he asked for, but the club could not meet them.

Junior
After receiving offers from Barcelona of Ecuador and Necaxa of Mexico, in January 2008, the midfielder went back to Colombia to play for Junior de Barranquilla, signing a three-year contract and becoming the most expensive transfer made by the team at that time. When Hernandez arrived, Junior were close to being relegated, because the team had very poor 2006 and 2007 seasons. Junior also had a poor 2008 Apertura season, failing to qualify for the playoffs, but in the 2008 Finalizacion, with the help of Hernandez and other new signings, Junior reached the playoffs and avoided relegation as well.

In the 2009 Apertura, he scored 5 goals to help Junior reach the finals, where they lost to Once Caldas. He had a great 2009 Clausura season, scoring nine goals in 15 games, including a streak of five consecutive games scoring. His goals helped Junior make the playoffs, but he failed to score any in the playoffs and Junior eventually missed out on the finals. Junior won the 2010 Apertura, which was his first title with the club. In December 2010, Universitario of the Peruvian Primera División made an offer for him, but Hernandez declined, expressing his desire to stay in Barranquilla. After declining the offer, he signed a two-year contract extension.

In the 2011 Clausura, Junior qualified for the playoffs, and faced Millonarios in the semi-finals. Junior lost the first leg 3-0, but in the second leg Junior came back and won 3-0, with Hernandez scoring the goal to tie the series. He later scored his penalty in the shootout, which Junior won to qualify to the final. In the finals, Junior won the first leg 3-2. In the second leg on 21 December, Once Caldas won 2-1 and tied the series, sending the game into penalties. He assisted Carlos Bacca's goal and scored his penalty in the shootout to win his second title with Junior.

In December 2012, Hernandez told Junior's president that he wished to stay at the club and renovate his contract for two more years. However, the club only gave him the option to renovate his contract for one year, and he left the club that month.

Independiente Medellin 
On 20 December 2012, he returned to Independiente Medellín, the club he played for from 1996 to 1999.

In September 2013, he had an argument with manager Pedro Sarmiento after being subbed off early in a loss against Boyaca Chico and not being included in the squad in the following match against Atlético Nacional. However, everything was settled quickly and he resumed training within a few days. At the end of the 2014 Apertura, Hernandez left the club.

Uniautonoma 
In June 2014, Hernandez joined Uniautónoma for the 2014 Finalizacion tournament.

Personal life 
In September 2010, it was reported that Hernandez failed to pay approximately 865,000 pesos ($215,000 dollars) to the Argentine government while he was playing for Colon in 2005.

International career
Hernández was called up to the Colombia national team for the 2001 Copa América, which they won. Colombia did not qualify for the 2002 FIFA World Cup but did qualify for the 2003 Confederations Cup where he was called up again. Giovanni scored 3 goals in 5 games and he was considered one of the best players of the tournament. He played in the 2003 CONCACAF Gold Cup with a lacklustre performance, not scoring a single goal.

After a three-year absence from the Colombia national team, Giovanni was recalled for the match against Mexico on 22 August 2007.

International goals

|}

Honours

Club
América de Cali
 Copa Libertadores (1): Runner–up 1996

Colo-Colo
 Primera División de Chile (2): 2007 Apertura, 2007 Clausura

Junior
 Colombian Primera A (2): 2010 Apertura, 2011 Finalización

International
 Copa América (1): 2001

Individual
 CONCACAF Gold Cup Best XI: 2003

References

External links
 Giovanni Hernández at Football Lineups
 
 Argentine Primera statistics at Fútbol XXI  

1976 births
Living people
Footballers from Cali
Colombian footballers
Colombian expatriate footballers
Colombia international footballers
Association football midfielders
Club Atlético Colón footballers
Colo-Colo footballers
Once Caldas footballers
América de Cali footballers
Independiente Medellín footballers
Deportivo Cali footballers
Atlético Junior footballers
Categoría Primera A players
Argentine Primera División players
Expatriate footballers in Argentina
Chilean Primera División players
Expatriate footballers in Chile
Colombian expatriate sportspeople in Chile
Colombian expatriate sportspeople in Argentina
2001 Copa América players
2003 FIFA Confederations Cup players
2003 CONCACAF Gold Cup players
Copa América-winning players
Uniautónoma F.C. footballers